Raymond Patriarca may refer to: 

Raymond L.S. Patriarca, Providence mobster and founder of the Patriarca crime family
Raymond Patriarca, Jr., Providence mobster and former leader of the Patriarca crime family 

pl:Raymond Patriarca